Fra Alof de Wignacourt (1547 – 14 September 1622) was a French nobleman who was the 54th Grand Master of the Order of St. John of Jerusalem from 10 February 1601 to his death in 1622. Unlike a number of the other Grand Masters, he was popular with the Maltese people. Wignacourt is mostly remembered for the construction of the Wignacourt Aqueduct as well as a series of coastal towers which also bear his name.

Wignacourt joined the Order in 1564, aged seventeen, and distinguished himself at the Great Siege of Malta a year later. He was elected Grand Master in 1601.

In order to ensure that the local population continued to celebrate the date of his accession, he declared the date of the shipwreck of St Paul in Malta to be the 10 of February; a date that is celebrated passionately until today.

He was patron of Caravaggio following the artist's arrival in Malta in 1607 until his arrest and subsequent expulsion from the Order in 1608.

His reign was notable for the construction of a number of coastal fortifications (the Wignacourt towers), and of the Wignacourt Aqueduct that brought water from the plateau above Rabat to Valletta. The Wignacourt Arch was built as a part of the aqueduct between Birkirkara and Santa Venera, and it had his coat of arms with three fleur-de-lys on it, giving it the name of the Fleur-de-Lys Gate. A settlement which developed around this area is now known as Fleur-de-Lys, and the three fleur-de-lys from the coat of arms also appear on the flag of Santa Venera.

During his reign, in 1614 the Ottomans made their final attempt to conquer Malta. Six thousand men landed at Marsascala Bay, and raided the village of Żejtun. The Order's cavalry and Maltese civilians, however, managed to overcome the Turks who retreated, without a single Christian dead.

His parade armour survives and is one of the treasures of the armoury of the Grandmaster's Palace in Valletta.

Alof de Wignacourt died of apoplexy while he was out shooting on 14 September 1622 at the age of 75.

See also

Wignacourt towers
Portrait of Alof de Wignacourt and his Page

References

External links
 Coins of Grandmaster Alof de Wignacourt

Grand Masters of the Knights Hospitaller
1547 births
1622 deaths
Knights of Malta
French Roman Catholics
17th-century French people
17th-century Roman Catholics
Burials at Saint John's Co-Cathedral